Johnny Mathis Sings the Music of Bacharach & Kaempfert is an album by American pop singer Johnny Mathis that was released in the fall of 1970 by Columbia Records. While one half of the two-record set was a compilation of tracks from his previous albums that were composed by Burt Bacharach, the other consisted of new recordings of songs composed by Bert Kaempfert, including a new version of "Strangers in the Night", which Mathis had already recorded in 1966 for his LP Johnny Mathis Sings. Although the Kaempfert tribute was similar to recent Mathis albums in that he was mainly covering songs made popular by other singers, it was absent of hits from the 12 months previous to its release that had become the pattern of his output at this point. The latest US chartings of any of the Kaempfert compositions as of this album's debut came from 1967 recordings of "Lady" by Jack Jones and "The Lady Smiles" by Matt Monro.

The album made its first appearance on Billboard magazine's Top LP's chart in the issue dated January 23, 1971, and reached number 169 during its seven weeks there.

Sides one and two of Kaempfert songs had already been released in the UK as Johnny Mathis Sings the Music of Bert Kaempfert in November 1969.

Track listing
All tracks on sides one and two were recorded October 21–23, 1968.

Side one
"Wonderland by Night" (Lincoln Chase, Klaus-Gunter Neumann) – 3:34
"Spanish Eyes" (Bert Kaempfert, Charles Singleton, Eddie Snyder) – 3:00
"The Lady Smiles" (Richard Ahlert, Kaempfert, Herbert Rehbein) – 3:06
"Danke Schoen" (Milt Gabler, Kaempfert, Kurt Schwabach) – 2:56
"The Times Will Change" (Kaempfert, Rehbein, Carl Sigman) – 3:09
"Remember When (We Made These Memories)" (Kaempfert, Singleton, Snyder) – 2:58

Side two
"Strangers in the Night" (Kaempfert, Singleton, Snyder) – 3:34
"Don't Stay" (Ahlert, Kaempfert, Rehbein) – 2:51
"If There's a Way" (Kaempfert, Jimmy Radcliffe, Rehbein, Buddy Scott) – 2:55
"Lady" (Kaempfert, Larry Kusik, Rehbein, Singleton) – 3:00 
"L-O-V-E" (Gabler, Kaempfert) – 2:30

Side three
"Walk On By" (Burt Bacharach, Hal David) – 3:00
"The Look of Love" from Casino Royale (Bacharach, David) – 3:41
"I Say a Little Prayer" (Bacharach, David) – 2:14
above three recorded and released in 1968 for the album Love Is Blue 
"Heavenly" (Bacharach, Sidney Shaw) – 3:19
rec. and rel. in 1959 for the album Heavenly
"This Guy's in Love with You" (Bacharach, David) – 4:35
rec. and rel. in 1968 for the album Those Were the Days

Side four
"I'll Never Fall in Love Again" from Promises, Promises (Bacharach, David) – 3:00
rec. and rel. in 1969 for the album Love Theme from "Romeo And Juliet" (A Time for Us)
"Alfie" from Alfie (Bacharach, David) – 3:13
"Odds and Ends" (Bacharach, David) – 3:02
above two rec. and rel. in 1970 for the album Raindrops Keep Fallin' on My Head
"Faithfully" (Bacharach, Shaw) – 2:32
rec. and rel. in 1959 for the album Faithfully
"Don't Go Breakin' My Heart" (Bacharach, David) – 2:21
rec. and rel. in 1968 for the album Love Is Blue

Bonus track
The 1969 UK LP of Kaempfert songs was released as part of the 2017 box set The Voice of Romance: The Columbia Original Album Collection.  Both the UK LP and the box set included a bonus track:
"It Makes No Difference" (Gabler, Kaempfert, Rehbein) – 2:32

Personnel
Johnny Mathis – vocals; liner notes
Robert Mersey – producer (except as noted); arranger and conductor ("Don't Go Breakin' My Heart", "I Say a Little Prayer", "I'll Never Fall in Love Again", "The Look of Love", "Walk On By")
Jack Gold – producer ("Alfie", "Odds and Ends")
Mitch Miller – producer ("Faithfully", "Heavenly")
Al Ham – producer ("Heavenly")
Herbert Rehbein – arranger and conductor (sides one and two)
Ernie Freeman – arranger and conductor ("Alfie", "Odds and Ends")
 Glenn Osser – arranger and conductor ("Faithfully", "Heavenly")
D'Arneill Pershing – arranger and conductor ("This Guy's In Love With You")
Peter Klemt – engineer (sides one and two)
Gunther Sorenson – engineer (sides one and two)
Frank Laico – engineer ("Don't Go Breakin' My Heart", "I Say a Little Prayer", "The Look of Love", "Walk On By")
Glen Kolotkin – engineer ("Don't Go Breakin' My Heart", "I Say a Little Prayer", "The Look of Love", "Walk On By")
Phil Macy – engineer ("Alfie", "I'll Never Fall in Love Again", "Odds and Ends")
Rafael O. Valentin – engineer ("This Guy's In Love With You")
Bert Kaempfert – liner notes
R.H.B.K. – liner notes
Guy Webster – photography 
Anne Blackford – album design
Special thanks to Bobmar Lord Alvin of Garden, otherwise known as Henry

References

Bibliography

 

1970 albums
Johnny Mathis albums
Tribute albums
Columbia Records albums
Albums arranged by Ernie Freeman
Albums conducted by Ernie Freeman
Albums arranged by Glenn Osser
Albums conducted by Glenn Osser
Albums produced by Al Ham
Albums produced by Mitch Miller
Burt Bacharach tribute albums